David Baird Jr. (October 10, 1881February 28, 1955)  was a U.S. Senator from New Jersey.

Biography
Born in Camden, New Jersey to Senator David Baird, Baird Jr. graduated from Lawrenceville School in 1899 and from Princeton University in 1903. Like his father, he engaged in the lumber business and banking in Camden from 1903 to 1929.

On November 30, 1929, Baird was appointed as a Republican to the United States Senate to fill the vacancy caused by the resignation of Walter Evans Edge. He served from November 30, 1929, to December 2, 1930, when a duly elected successor was qualified. Baird was not a candidate for election to the vacancy in 1930.

Baird was an unsuccessful candidate for Governor of New Jersey in 1931, after which he resumed former business pursuits.

He was appointed by the Governor to the Delaware River Joint Toll Bridge Commission to fill an unexpired term in 1938. He then worked as insurance broker, and died in Camden in 1955, aged 73. He was interred in Harleigh Cemetery.

External links

 
 David Baird Jr. at The Political Graveyard
 

1881 births
1955 deaths
American bankers
Lawrenceville School alumni
New Jersey Republicans
Politicians from Camden, New Jersey
Princeton University alumni
Republican Party United States senators from New Jersey
Burials at Harleigh Cemetery, Camden
20th-century American politicians